The Ralston Steel Car Company operated in Columbus, Ohio, from 1905 to 1953. The company began by modifying wood freight cars to add steel underframes. Later it manufactured its own line of all-steel rail cars.

Founding 
Joseph S. Ralston and Anton Becker founded the Ralston Steel Car Company in 1905 by purchasing the plant of the Rarig Engineering Company on the east side of Columbus. Becker had just patented a drop-bottom gondola car which would allow the automatic unloading of coal and ballast cars (hopper cars). Prior to this invention, cars were unloaded by hand shoveling. An example of a Ralston-built drop gondola can be seen here.

Expansion 
With the increase in power of steam locomotives, the old wood freight cars could not take the strain, and demand for Ralston's all-steel cars exploded. By 1910, a wide variety of cars were being produced.

Depression, War Surge, and Decline 
During the Great Depression, orders fell off precipitously. However, the build-up to World War II in the late 1930s revived the concern, and workers were called back to work. Employment reached 700 by the summer of 1940, and was producing 25 to 30 cars per day, and as many as 40 per day was possible.

After the war, however, demand for new freight cars plunged, since so many had been built during the war. Ralston was unable to ride out the slowdown, and shut its doors in 1953.

See also
List of rolling stock manufacturers

References

External links 

 ColumbusRailroads.com. The Ralston Steel Car Company (extensive history and photos)

Defunct rolling stock manufacturers of the United States
Rail transportation in Ohio
Defunct companies based in Columbus, Ohio
Vehicle manufacturing companies established in 1905
Manufacturing companies disestablished in 1953
1905 establishments in Ohio